The 1964 United States Senate election in Virginia was held on November 3, 1964. Incumbent Senator Harry F. Byrd, Sr. was re-elected to a seventh term after defeating Republican Richard A. May and independent James W. Respess. This was the last time before 2008 that the state voted simultaneously for a Democratic presidential candidate and a Democratic senate candidate.

Results

References

See also 
 United States Senate elections, 1964

Virginia
1964
United States Senate